was a Ryukyuan gusuku during the Gusuku Period of Ryukyuan history. It is famous for being the birthplace of the Ryukyuan general Gosamaru. Gosamaru led the army of the castle's magiri against Nakijin Castle in 1416, helping the King of Chūzan to conquer Hokuzan. In return for his loyalty, Gosamaru was given land in Yomitanzan and allowed to build a new gusuku. He used materials from Yamada Castle to build Zakimi Castle in 1420. The ruins of Yamada Castle are in present-day Onna, Okinawa, in the Yamada district.

References

Castles in Okinawa Prefecture